The Kentucky Department of Corrections is a state agency of the Kentucky Justice & Public Safety Cabinet that operates state-owned adult correctional facilities and provides oversight for and sets standards for county jails. They also provide training, community based services, and oversees the state's Probation & Parole Division. The agency is headquartered in the Health Services Building in Frankfort.

Facilities

State-owned or operated

Following is a list of Kentucky state prisons:

Private prisons 

In June 2013, Kentucky temporarily ended its decades-long relationship with Corrections Corporation of America (CCA) (now CoreCivic), closing Marion Adjustment Center in St. Mary, the last private prison at the time that housed Kentucky inmates. This decision was widely applauded across the state, as the tax dollar savings totaled in the millions.

Otter Creek Correctional Center in Wheelright was closed in 2012 amid continued allegations of medical neglect, shoddy security, and sexual abuse of inmates from staff. It is still owned by CoreCivic. On October 18, 2019, Kentucky Governor Matt Bevin announced that the Commonwealth of Kentucky would enter into a ten-year agreement with CoreCivic to lease and reopen the facility. The prison, which was renamed the Southeast State Correctional Complex, will be operated and staffed by the Kentucky Department of Corrections and will be managed under the same rules and procedures as state-owned prisons. The prison reopened under state management in September 2020.

Lee Adjustment Center in Beattyville, also operated by CoreCivic, housed out-of-state inmates from Vermont until 2010. In November 2017, due to facility overcrowding, the Kentucky Department of Corrections signed a contract allowing CoreCivic to reactivate the vacant prison to house up to 800 male inmates. These inmates would be transferred from the Kentucky State Reformatory. The facility reopened and began accepting inmates in March 2018.

Death row
The Kentucky State Penitentiary (KSP) houses the male death row. The Kentucky Correctional Institute for Women houses the female death row. Executions occur at KSP.

History

Between 1967 and 2011, 67% of Kentucky's executions were abolished. For this reason, in 2011 the American Bar Association (ABA) recommended suspending capital punishment in the state. In 2015, Kentucky Senator Robin Webb introduced a death penalty reform bill. The text of the bill called for changes in training for law enforcement and court officials. The bill also focused on the collection and retention of DNA evidence. On March 25, 2022, the Kentucky Senate approved a bill banning the death penalty for people with serious mental illnesses.

Staffing 

Since the beginning of the 2015 fiscal year, the department has seen a staffing shortage  to low salaries, constant overtime (currently nearing $10 million), and the lure of higher paying jobs in the private sector. In response to this staffing crisis and continued pressure from correctional employees, the Kentucky Legislature held a special session and approved an immediate 13.1% salary increase for current security staff, moved non-security staff to 40 hour work weeks, and increased the starting salary for Correctional Officers from $23,346 to $30,000 annually. Shortly after taking office, former governor Matt Bevin included $4.5 million in his biennial budget proposal to provide retention raises for correctional staff.

Health care
In July 2021, the department won a court ruling allowing it to deny health care to prisoners in order to save money. The ruling pertains to a treatment for Hepatitis C, which cost from $13,000 to $32,000.

See also

 List of law enforcement agencies in Kentucky
 List of United States state correction agencies
 List of U.S. state prisons
 Prison

References

External links
 Kentucky DOC Website

State law enforcement agencies of Kentucky
State corrections departments of the United States
 
Kentucky